The Chard Canal was a  tub boat canal in Somerset, England, that ran from the Bridgwater and Taunton Canal at Creech St. Michael, over four aqueducts, through three tunnels and four inclined planes to Chard. It was completed in 1842, was never commercially viable, and closed in 1868. The major engineering features are still clearly visible in the landscape.

Precursors
Prior to the construction of the canal, there had been several plans over the previous 50 years to build a ship canal from the Bristol Channel to the English Channel, in order to avoid the route around Cornwall and Devon. The first which would have connected Chard to the canal network was a scheme surveyed in 1769 by Robert Whitworth, to link the River Parrett to Seaton in Devon. Whitworth was asked to reassess this route in the early 1790s, and again thought it was feasible. The plan was revived in 1793, while another route was suggested in 1794 by Josiah Easton, again passing through Chard.

The 1793 Chard Canal plan was revived in 1809, by now renamed as the English and Bristol Channels Canal, and the engineer John Rennie was asked to survey it in 1810. He advocated a small ship canal, suitable for vessels up to 120 tons. The cost of a barge canal had been estimated at £70,000, but Rennie's estimate for a ship canal was £1.33M. 

Thomas Telford produced the survey, an Act of Parliament was obtained on 6 July 1825, and although subscriptions of over £1.5M were promised, no further action occurred, with the Company disappearing after 1828.

History
With the Bridgwater and Taunton Canal having opened in 1827, there was further initiative to link Chard to it, and James Green carried out a survey in 1831. An Act of Parliament was obtained in June 1834, authorising the raising of £57,000, with an additional £20,000 if required, but local enthusiasm for the scheme was muted, and most of the capital was provided by just five men, all of whom were involved in the Bridgwater and Taunton Canal. 

Work began at Wrantage in June 1835, but the Act did not allow parts of the canal to be built until tunnelling was well-advanced, and so work on the upper sections did not start until Autumn 1837. Green was replaced as engineer by Sydney Hall from the start of construction, and in view of the problems Green was experiencing on the Grand Western Canal with commissioning his boat lifts, Hall decided to replace the lifts with inclined planes instead.

Further changes to the original plans were made above Ilminster inclined plane, where another tunnel was constructed, enabling the line of the canal to be built at a lower level. Construction costs were much higher than anticipated, and another Act of Parliament was obtained in March 1840, allowing the Company to raise another £80,000 in shares, and to obtain a mortgage for £26,000, while a third Act in 1841 allowed construction to continue beyond the original seven year limit. The canal opened to Ilminster on 15 May 1841, and to Dowlish Ford wharfs on 3 February 1842. 

There were delays caused by the rope on the Wrantage plane breaking, resulting in damage to the caissons, and further delays caused by the Bristol and Exeter Railway constructing their line under the canal at Creech, but the work was finally completed on 24 May 1842. There were immediate benefits to the community, as coal prices fell, but the total cost of construction had been about £140,000, and as income was only a third of what had been projected, the canal company was never able to meet even the interest payments on its debts.

Operation
The inclines at Thornfalcon, Wrantage and Ilminster were double-acting inclines, consisting of two parallel tracks, each containing a six-wheeled caisson, in which the boats floated. A chain linked the two caissons together, passing round a horizontal drum situated at the top of the incline. Power for the movement of the boats was provided by over-filling the top caisson, the extra weight causing that caisson to descend and the other to rise. Because the majority of traffic passed up the canal, and a boat displaces its own weight in water (Archimedes' principle), considerably more water passed down the incline than up it. However, the system was still more economical than using locks, and a large new Chard Reservoir supplied the necessary water. 

The incline at Chard Common was quite different, consisting of a single track, with the tub-boats being carried on a cradle with four wheels. Power was supplied by a Whitelaw and Stirrat water turbine, with a  head, which used  of water per minute. Boats were raised  in a wheeled cradle up a slope of 1:10. The cradle was attached to the turbine by a substantial wire rope, after breakages of the original rope.
However the Crimson Hill Tunnel has a double width "passing area" about halfway through its course to allow passing of the boats from either direction.

The main cargoes were coal and stone. Traffic for the first three years rose from 25,835 tons to 33,284 tons, about two thirds of which was coal or culm (anthracite). Competition started immediately, with the railway arriving at Taunton in 1842, and the Westport Canal being completed in 1840. Attempts were made to convert the canal to a railway, and an Act of Parliament obtained in 1847 changed the name of the Company to the Chard Railway Company, but successive plans were thwarted by the inability of the Company to repay its debts. 

The canal went into receivership in 1853, after which there were discussions with the Bristol and Exeter Railway and the London and South Western Railway, with a view to building a branch to Chard. A new Chard Railway Company was constituted in 1860, and another Company was formed in 1861, to construct a branch from Taunton to Chard. The London and South Western Railway took over the Chard Railway, and the Bristol and Exeter built the branch from Taunton to Chard. 

In order to prevent competition from the L&SWR, the Bristol and Exeter Railway bought the Grand Western Canal, the Bridgwater and Taunton Canal and the Chard Canal, so that the L&SWR could not. They paid £5,945 for the Chard Canal, with the takeover and closing of the canal being authorised by an Act of Parliament obtained in 1867. The receivers were discharged in February 1868, and it seems likely that the canal was closed then.

Remains

The Chard reservoir, which was the main supply for the canal, was sold to Lord Poulett. In 1990, South Somerset District Council bought it, and it is now a designated nature reserve. Surrounded by woodland, it provides habitat for over 150 species of birds. The remains of the inclines have survived over 140 years of neglect, as have the three tunnels. Near Lower Farm, a bridge on the Thornfalcon to Creech road is now a grade II listed structure, and the three-arched aqueduct which carried the canal over the River Tone is largely intact, although it no longer has its parapets.

During World War II part of the Taunton Stop Line invasion defence project ran along the canal.

Co-ordinates

See also

Canals of the United Kingdom
History of the British canal system

Bibliography

References

External links

Index to photographs Somerset County Council's Historic Environment Record

Canals in Somerset
History of Somerset
Chard, Somerset
Canals opened in 1842
1842 establishments in England